The following is a list of events affecting Philippine television in 1986. Events listed include television show debuts, finales, cancellations, and channel launches, closures and rebrandings, as well as information about controversies and carriage disputes.

Events
 January 6 - The afternoon talent-variety program That's Entertainment makes its premiere telecast on GMA 7.
 February 24–25 - At the midst of the People Power Revolution rebel forces capture state channel MBS Channel 4 at the ABS-CBN Broadcasting Center on the 24th and private channels 2, 9 and 13 at the Broadcast City complex the day after.
 March 20 - At the aftermath of the People Power Revolution, City 2 Television (formerly BBC 2) ended operations after almost 13 years.
 May 19 - GMA debuts two new newscasts, GMA Balita and GMA Headline News.
 July 14 - IBC debuts two new newscasts, Balita sa IBC and Balita sa IBC Huling Ulat.
 September 14 - After 14 years of closure, ABS-CBN was reopened at the end of Marcos' dictatorship.
 September 15 – ABS-CBN debuts two comeback newscasts, Balita Ngayon and The World TonightPremieres

Unknown date
UnknownWeekend with Velez on GMA 7ABS-CBN International Report on ABS-CBN 2Good Morning Philippines on ABS-CBN 2Parak on ABS-CBN 2Children's Hour on ABS-CBN 2 on ABS-CBN 2Teen Pan Alley on ABS-CBN 2No Permanent Address on RPN 9Plaza 1899 on RPN 9Sa Kabukiran on RPN 9Stop Watch on RPN 9Simply Snooky on RPN 9Teenage Diary on RPN 9Export... Made in the Philippines on IBC 13Hiyas on IBC 13Travel Time on IBC 13Ora Engkantada on IBC 13Pinoy Thriller on IBC 13Scoop on IBC 13See True on GMA 7Early Evening Report on PTV 4Late Evening Report on PTV 4A Dialogue with Pres. C. Aquino on PTV 4Headline on PTV 4KB Kaibigan on PTV 4No Holds Barred on PTV 4Public Eye on PTV 4Tinig Bayan on PTV 4Tugon on PTV 4Da Young Once on PTV 4Mga Kwentong Buhay on PTV 4Pabrika on PTV 4Viva Drama Specials on PTV 4Big Ike's Happening on PTV 4Last Wave 1986 on PTV 4Maria! Maria! on PTV 4This Is It! on PTV 4People's Privilege Hour on PTV 4

Programs transferring networks

Finales
January 3: Anna Liza (rerun) on GMA 7
March 20: BBC/City 2 Balita on City 2 Television
May 16:
 News at Seven on GMA 7
 The 11:30 Report on GMA 7
June 7: Student Canteen on GMA 7
July 11:
 Newsday on IBC 13
 Mid-day Report on IBC 13
November 21:
 Luneta: Discovery Hour on ABS-CBN 2
 Hilakbot on ABS-CBN 2
December 12: Ina on ABS-CBN 2

UnknownNewsCenter 4 on MBS 4Manila Envelope on MBS 4In TUX icating on ABS-CBN 2Lots of Catch on ABS-CBN 2Bar None on ABS-CBN 2Overseas Unlimited on ABS-CBN 2Good Morning Philippines on ABS-CBN 2Pointblank on IBC 13Seeing Stars with Joe Quirino on IBC 13Turn on 13 on IBC 13IBCinema on IBC 13See True on IBC 13Kahapon Lamang on GMA 7The Bob Stewart Show on GMA 7Discorama on GMA 7Uncle Bob and Friends on GMA 7Pass the Mike with JQ and Willie on GMA 7Stop, Look & Listen on GMA 7Two for the Road on GMA 7Pasikatan sa Siete on GMA 7Ecotrends on GMA 7

Channels

Launches
 September 14: ABS-CBNClosures
 March 20: City 2 Television''

Births
January 4 – Katrina Halili, actress
January 13 – Jan Manual, actor and TV Host
January 25 – Luane Dy, actress and TV host
January 26 –
 Ervic Vijandre, Filipino actor and basketball player
 Kian Kazemi, Iranian-Filipino actor, reality show contestant and TV host
February 7 – Hermes Bautista, Filipino-American actor
February 12 – Georgina Wilson, Filipino-British actress and TV host
February 14 – Roxanne Guinoo, actress
February 18 – Brenan Espartinez, Filipino singer (former child actor)
March 1 – Sophia Montecarlo
March 10 – JC de Vera, Filipino actor, host and model
March 18 – Bianca King, Filipina-German model and actress
March 28 – Dion Ignacio, actor and TV Host
April 28 - Tom Taus, actor and TV Host
May 16 – Shamcey Supsup, model, TV host and Miss Universe Philippines 2011 winner
May 26 –
 Alex Medina, Filipino, film and television actor
 Geoff Taylor, is a Filipino singer, model and actor
June 6 – Anton dela Paz, Broadcaster and TV Personality (former actor)
June 8 – Japoy Lizardo, Filipino taekwondo, practitioner, actor and commercial model.
June 12 – Carla Abellana, actress
June 13 – Ayanna Oliva, Filipina, model, singer, dancer, host DJ and VJ
June 29 – Iya Villania, Filipino-Australian actress and TV host
August 10 – Mercedes Cabral, actress
August 29 – Joem Bascon, actor
August 30 – Franz Ocampo, Broadcaster (Former Actress & TV Host)
August 31 – Rachelle Ann Go, singer and actress
September 13 – Sugar Mercado, Filipino dancer and actress
September 27 – Chai Fonacier, actress and singer
October 2 – Pancho Magno, actor
October 13 – Dave Valentino, Broadcaster and TV Personality
October 22 – Matt Evans, actor
November 4 – Angelica Panganiban, actress
November 5 – Dianne Medina, actress, dancer, TV host and model
November 22 – Erika Padilla, Filipino actress, TV host, model and sideline reporter
November 23 – Maxene Magalona, actress
December 14 – Mark Herras, actor
December 21 – Karel Marquez, actress, model, singer and TV host
December 29 –
 Chris Cayzer, Filipino-Australian soul, R&B and acoustic singer, actor, DJ and VJ.
 Ina Feleo, actress, figure skater, dancer and writer
December 31 – Mike Tan, actor

References

See also
1986 in the Philippines
1986 in television

 
Philippine television-related lists
Television in the Philippines by year